Nathan Clarke (born 27 October 1979) is a former Australian rules footballer who played with the Brisbane Lions in the Australian Football League (AFL).

Clarke was recruited by Brisbane through the rookie draft, from Maroochydore in Queensland. His father, Barry, is a half forward flanker in the state's official Team of the Century.

A utility, he played his first game late in the 2000 AFL season, against Hawthorn at the Gabba. In a memorable league debut, Clarke kicked two goals, took 10 marks and had 18 disposals. After appearing just twice in 2001, a Brisbane premiership year, he was delisted by the Lions. Clarke then nominated for the 2001 AFL Draft and was redrafted by Brisbane with pick 45, which they had received in the Trent Knobel trade. He wasn't able to break into the seniors in 2002 and was delisted again, at the end of the year.

He coached the Brisbane Lions reserves side, who compete in the North East Australian Football League Northern Conference, to two premierships in 2011 and 2012.  Previously he played in Canberra, where he captain-coached Eastlake.

References

1979 births
Australian rules footballers from Queensland
Brisbane Lions players
Eastlake Football Club players
Living people